Stephania tomentella is a herbaceous perennial vine of the family Menispermaceae and genus Stephania. It is native to Southeast Asia and was first described in Thailand in 1988 by L. L. Forman. It is one of 15 Stephania found only in northern Thailand, specifically in the area around Chiang Rai. It is commonly found amongst limestone rocks.

References

tomentella
Endemic flora of Thailand
Medicinal plants
Plants described in 1988